Paris Métro Line 10 is one of 16 metro lines in Paris, France. The line links the Boulogne – Pont de Saint Cloud metro station in Boulogne in the west with the Gare d'Austerlitz, travelling under the neighborhoods situated on the Rive Gauche in the southern half of Paris and the commune of Boulogne-Billancourt.  Its two termini are Gare d'Austerlitz and Boulogne – Pont de Saint-Cloud.

It has the least traffic of any of the 14 main metro lines (excluding lines 3bis and 7bis).

Initially, the MA 51 model trains, which had previously been used on line 13 until it joined line 14, circulated the tracks of line 10.  These trains were first constructed with three cars on four bogies per train, and two trains permanently connected to make six cars per train, having an equivalent capacity to five cars on the classic metro trains.  Because of the ineffectiveness of the MA 51 model, it was eventually completely replaced by the MF 67 model.

The line's history is closely tied to that of lines 7, 8, and 13.  A section of line 10's route was replaced by line 13, and line 10 replaced part of line 7 for more than a year, until eventually replacing the western section of line 8 where its terminus was replaced by Balard.  There is a ghost station named Croix-Rouge between Sèvres Babylone and Mabillon. It was closed in 1939.  Consequently, line 10 has changed the most of any other métro line during its lifetime.  Unlike those of other lines, the walls of line 10's tunnels are painted white, creating a brightness that is not found on any other métro line.

Route and stations
The route is entirely underground.

List of stations
Beginning at the western terminus of line 10, the first train that leaves the station Porte d'Auteuil heads towards the terminus of gare d'Austerlitz.  At this time, passengers may ride on the turn-around track, which is closed to passengers for the rest of the day.  SIEL, système d'information en ligne, gives passengers on the platforms the time-to-arrival of the next two trains, and has been operational since 1 July 2008.

At the terminus Boulogne – Pont de Saint-Cloud (Rhin et Danube), because of the proximity to the Seine, there are no tracks behind the station to allow the train to reverse directions. Instead, trains are received alternately on each side of the platform and leave directly in the opposite direction. Due to the narrowness of the rue du Château, under which line 10 passes, the stations Boulogne – Pont de Saint-Cloud (Rhin et Danube) and Boulogne – Jean Jaurès have only one central platform used for both directions. Tracks 1 (towards Austerlitz) must successively pass under the Boulevard Périphérique, followed by the platforms for the connections to Auteuil and Murat before ascending to service the station Michel – Ange – Molitor. In order to achieve this, ramps reaching a descent of up to a 40‰ grade are used. Tracks 2 (towards Boulogne) are separated by the loop on the level of the avenue du Général-Sarrail with a bend and a slope of 40‰.

The loop to Auteuil is situated in the neighborhood of Auteuil: tracks 1 and 3 of the loop border the central platform of Miche-Ange – Molitor.  Afterwards, they pass under the rails of line 9, until combining at the arrival to Chardon-Lagache with a unique platform.  Finally, tracks 1 reach the station Mirabeau and then go towards Austerlitz.

Tracks 2, coming from Austerlitz, follow a very peculiar profile and do not service the station Mirabeau, instead crossing behind it with a sharp ramp due to the great depth of the line after traversing the Seine.  Furthermore, in order to reach the station Église d'Auteuil, the tracks must climb even higher very close to the station's foundation.  Following this, tracks 2 of the line pass behind tracks of line 9 and arrive at the station Michel-Ange – Auteuil, which has a central platform surrounded by tracks 2 and tracks H coming from a connection with line 9.  Arriving at Porte d'Auteuil, the tracks separate to form the complexity of tracks that head towards Boulougne, a maintenance station, Murat, or towards Michel-Ange – Molitor.

After the station Mirabeau, the line crosses the Seine via an underwater tunnel and reaches the station Javel – André Citroën by way of a 40‰ ramp after passing under tracks of line C of the RER.  Following this, the line follows avenue Émile-Zola to arrive at the stations Charles Michels and Avenue Émile Zola before joining the rue du Commerce.  When the line reaches the station La Motte-Picquet – Grenelle, the two tracks separate: tracks 1 are situated in a half-station with platform 1 of line 8 and tracks 2 service a half station but without tracks 2 of line 8 which are situated below.  Before arriving at the station Ségur, the line passes under the Rapp intake.  It then services the stations Duroc, Vaneau and Sèvres – Babylone.  The line continues eastward and passes through the vacant station Croix-Rouge, which was closed on 2 September 1939.  Finally, the line arrives at Mabillon.

Beginning at Odéon the route of line 10 becomes complixed as it must pass an intersection with line 4.  The two tracks part in order to yield passage to the connection tracks that arrive in the middle of the circulation tracks and level off at the station Cluny – La Sorbonne.  The connection tracks rejoin the other tracks of line 10 before the station Maubert – Mutualité.  The same principle is in effect with the connection to line 7 but these double tracks pass under the tracks of line 10 before the station Cardinal Lemoine.  When the route reaches the station Jussieu, lines 7 and 10 follow parallel routes which allows for the platforms of the two lines to be side by side.  Finally, the line follows bends in both direction under the Jardin des plantes to arrive at the terminus, Gare d'Austerlitz.  The arrival is situated under the arrivals hall of the train station, and the turn-around loop is under the railroad tracks.  This cul-de-sac is peculiar in the sense that it is configured to receive an underwater passing coming from the gare de Paris-Lyon.

Split section of line 10

Line 10 has separate eastbound and westbound sections between the stations of Boulogne – Jean Jaurès (west) and Javel – André Citroën. Both sections run side by side between Javel – André Citroën and Mirabeau, but the Mirabeau station is only served by eastbound trains. Westbound trains pass through Mirabeau on an inclined ramp behind the eastbound tracks.

Westbound section

Eastbound section

The separate sections were once part of a loop that returned westgoing trains to Javel – André Citroën. After Porte d'Auteuil (last station on the westbound section) the trains turned round to Michel-Ange – Molitor (first station on the eastbound section). When the line was extended with Jean Jaurès and Boulogne the section was no longer operated as a loop.

Porte d'Auteuil is also connected with Porte de Saint-Cloud of line 9. This connection is called "voie Murat" and it passes the ghost station Porte Molitor. The station was meant for spectators leaving the Parc des Princes football stadium, but plans were changed and access to the station from the streets was never constructed.
Westbound trains on line 10 (terminating at Porte d'Auteuil) can be re-routed to line 9, starting eastbound at Porte de Saint-Cloud via the "voie Murat" connection. This option is used after events at Parc des Princes when Line 9 is used by unusually many people.

Renamed stations
Five stations on line 10 have changed names of the course of the years:
La Motte-Picquet became La Motte-Picquet – Grenelle in November 1913;
Wilhem became Église d'Auteuil on 15 May 1921;
Beaugrenelle became Charles Michels on 14 July 1945;
Gare d'Orléans – Austerlitz became Gare d'Austerlitz in 1979;
Cluny became Cluny – La Sorbonne on 17 February 1988.

Themed and otherwise unique stations

Some stations on the line are decorated with a particular cultural theme in mind:

The station Javel – André Citroën presents the life and enterprise of André Citroën with the use of placards and photographs.  The seats of the station use the colors of the celebrated logo composed of chevrons, inspired by gears constructed in 1905.  These decorations however were removed during the 2000s in light the renovation project "Renouveau du Métro".

The halls used for connections in the station La Motte-Picquet – Grenelle are decorated with various coats of arms of the Toussaint-Guillaume Picquet de la Motte family (blue with three golden chevrons, accompanied by three silver arrowheads).  A fresco represents the barrière de la Cunette, one of the doors of the Wall of the Farmers-General that was one situated where the station is now.

The station Sèvres – Babylone contains an exposition of ecology, with showcases on recycling, renewable energy or water consumption and electricity consumption in the world.  In 2008, these windows were renovated with signs giving specific information on the initiatives of Grenelle Environnement.

The ceiling of the station Cluny – La Sorbonne is decorated with mosaics and signatures of famous writers such as Racine, Molière, Michelet, Victor Hugo, and Rimbaud.

Junctions

The line contains six junctions with other lines of the network:
with line 9 via Voie Murat and the depots located to the southwest of the station Porte d'Auteuil on the tracks of the old entrance that are no longer used in commercial service;
with line 9 at the entrance to the station Michel-Ange – Auteuil, on the tracks in the direction of Boulogne; this intersection runs alongside the platform of the station Michel-Ange – Auteuil, the edge of the platform being protected by fencing, and then intersects at the terminus.
with line 8 at the entrance to the station La Motte-Picquet – Grenelle, on the tracks heading towards Boulogne;
a tunnel without an intersection exists towards line 13, between the stations of Duroc and Vaneau; it dates back to the old route of line 10 towards Invalides;
with line 4 via a dead end in the east of the station Odéon, but intersecting in actuality at the east of the station Cluny – La Sorbonne after having traveled to the center of the station without bordering a platform; the intersection occurs between the two tracks of line 10 at the station Cluny – La Sorbonne where three tracks form but are then combined into the two of line 10;
with line 7 at the exit of the station Maubert – Mutualité in the direction of Gare d'Austerlitz; this two-track connection, used commercially between 1930 and 1931, is separated from line 10 by a strong slope between the two rails.

Depots

Trains on line 10 are serviced by the depots at Auteuil, which are connected to the tracks of the terminus Porte d'Auteuil.  These depots are entirely underground; other than tunnels, an escalator located on the sidewalk of the avenue du Géneral-Sarrail provides access.  The depots are connected to line 9 as well, however line 9 has not used these depots since the opening of those at Boulogne connected to Pont de Sèvres.

Both heavy and regular (batteries, tune-ups, and repainting) maintenance of the trains of line 10, as with all other trains on the rail network, takes place at the depot at Choisy. Opened in 1931, it is situated in the 8th arrondissement of Paris, close to the Boulevard Périphérique and accessible via a junction on line 7. It is composed of two distinct sections: a maintenance workshop for the trains of line 7 (AMT), and a workshop for changing the composition of the trains on the network.

Usage

Service
In 2008, one complete trip across the line took twenty-eight minutes in the west–east direction and twenty-nine minutes in the opposite direction.  As with all lines of the Paris métro (with the exception of the bis lines), the first departure of the day leaves the station at 5:30 am.  A train leaves from Boulogne – Pont de Saint-Cloud at 5:35 am, preceded by the first departure on the line from Porte d'Auteuil at 5:30 am, which is also the only train that will take passengers on the turn-around loop at Auteuil.

The last train leaves Boulogne – Pont de Saint Cloud at 12:47 am destined for Gare d'Austerlitz.  From Gare d'Austerlitz, the last train leaves at 12:35 am for Boulogne – Pont de Saint-Cloud and another for Porte d'Auteuil at 12:51 am.  From Friday night to Sunday and during holidays, the last departure from Boulogne – Pont de Saint-Cloud leaves at 1:47 am for Gare d'Austerlitz.  From this terminus, the last departure takes place at 1:35 am for Boulogne – Pont de Saint-Cloud and at 1:46 am for Port d'Auteuil.

Trains on line 10 are less frequent than those on other lines: the average time between trains is between three and five minutes during the day and between eight and nine minutes late night.  On Sunday mornings, the time between trains is between six and seven minutes, and about ten minutes Friday night, and all of Saturday, Sunday, and holidays after 12:30 am (after 1:15 am on Friday and Saturday nights).

Train sets

Line 10 has always been unique with respect to its train sets.  Before World War II, it was unusual in that it was circulated by Sprague model trains with two cars circulating alone as passenger traffic was very light.  Until 1976, old Spragues circulated the line with four cars each (two motor cars with four motors).

Line 13 transformed in the middle of the 1970s as a result of its junction with the old line 14, and a more modern and better performing train set, MF 67, was put in service.  Beginning 28 April 1975, the old MA 51 train sets of line 13, numbering 52 in total, were progressively transferred to line 10 and drastically modernized.  The cars were repainted, their outer bodies and seats replaced, and modern fluorescent lighting installed.  They circulated in permanent sets of six.  By June 1976, all of the trains had been transferred to line 10 and put into service, where they eventually ended their career.  In order to reform the old Sprague models and because of an insufficient number of trainsets, some MF 67 train sets of the A/D model were placed on line 10 as well.  The MA 1951 model was introduced between 1988 and 1994, and afterwards were replaced by MF 67 series E models coming from line 7bis.

Operational personnel

Employees of the métro can be divided into two categories: station agents and conductors.  Station agents are responsible for ticket sales, verifying passenger tickets, general management of the station, as well as other tasks as the needs of the service dictate.  The conductors assure the functioning of the trains.  Service is divided into three shifts: day, mixed, and night.

Fares and financing
Fares on line 10 are identical to those on the rest of the transport network and are accessible via the same tickets.  A ticket t+ allows for a single one-way trip with one or more connections with other lines of the metro as well as inner-city RER lines.

The financing of the functioning of the line, maintenance, cars, and employees is handled by the RATP, however fares are dictated legislatively and income from ticket sales do not completely cover the network's entire costs.  This difference is made up by funding from the Syndicat des transports d'Île-de-France (STIF) (Île-de-France Transportation Union), which has been presided over since 2005 by the president of the Conseil régional d'Île-de-France, composed of locally elected persons.  This group defines the general conditions of use as well as the duration and frequency of services.  Financing is assured by a 3.5 billion euro subsidy made possible through transportation deposits paid by corporations and contributions from public community groups.

Traffic
Line 10 is a secondary line on the Parisian network, and the number of total passengers amounts to only a little more than a quarter of the total passengers of line 1.  Line 10 is the least-traveled line on the network, with the exception of the short 3bis and 7bis lines.  Between 1992 and 2004, traffic has grown a total of 4.7%, which puts the line in 8th place in terms of growth (behind line 14).

The most frequented station of the line, in annual traffic with all lines considered, is Gare d'Austerlitz with 8.73 million passengers.  In 1998, daily traffic on line 10 averaged 148,613 passengers for each day the line was open, with 104,041 on Saturdays and 53,051 on Sundays.

Tourism

By way of its route, line 10 is limited to the south of the capital and, passing by few centers of activities, is rarely travelled by Parisians.  With the exception of the oriental section Gare d'Austerlitz – Duroc, traffic is very light.  On the other hand, the line is especially trafficked by students, as it links multiple important university centers such as the campus de Jussieu, la Sorbonne, and Sciences Po, for example.  The line services several places of interest to tourists in Paris and its western suburb:
The Parc de Saint-Cloud and the jardin et musée départemental Albert-Kahn at Boulogne-Billancourt (Boulogne – Pont de Saint-Cloud);
The jardin des serres d'Auteuil and the stadium Roland-Garros (Port d'Auteuil);
The Thermes de Cluny, the Musée national du Moyen Âge, and the Latin Quarter (Cluny – La Sorbonne, Maubert – Mutualité and Cardinal Lemoine);
Parc des Princes football stadium (home of Paris Saint-Germain football club).
Invalides hosting the tomb of Napoléon Bonaparte.
Saint-Germain-des-Prés – famous for its history linked to the birth of existentialism, its love for jazz in old caves, its old churches and monasteries and some globally famous cafés.
Saint-Michel and the Latin Quarter.
The Institut du monde Arabe (the Arab World Institute).
Gare d'Austerlitz.

History

Chronology

30 December 1923: The first section of Line 10 was opened between Invalides and Croix Rouge (today, most of this section is served by line 13 ).
10 March 1925: The line was extended eastbound from Croix Rouge to Mabillon.
14 February 1926: The line was extended from Mabillon to Odéon.
15 February 1930: The line was temporarily extended from Odéon to Place d'Italie.
7 March 1930: The line was extended from Place d'Italie to Porte de Choisy.
26 April 1931: The section from Place Monge to Porte de Choisy was transferred to line 7 (as a result of the opening of Line 7's tunnel under the Seine). line 10 was also extended from Maubert-Mutualité to Jussieu.
27 July 1937: The section from Duroc to Invalides was transferred to the former line 14 (now part of line 13, not today's line 14).
29 July 1937: Line 10 was extended westbound from Duroc to La Motte-Picquet.  The section between La Motte-Picquet and Porte d'Auteuil was transferred from line 8 to line 10.
12 July 1939: The line was extended eastbound from Jussieu to Gare d'Orléans-Austerlitz.
2 September 1939: As with many other stations, service to Croix-Rouge and Cluny-la Sorbonne stations ceased at the start of World War II. Both stations are eventually closed permanently.
3 October 1980: Line 10 was extended westbound from Porte d'Auteuil to Boulogne-Jean Jaurès.
2 October 1981: The line was extended from Boulogne-Jean Jaurès to Pont de Saint-Cloud.
17 February 1988: With to the opening of St-Michel station on the line B of the RER, Cluny-la Sorbonne Station was re-opened to allow a connection between the lines.

Service to Auteuil
Métro line 10 resulted from the connection of two sections, east and west, which created a set of distinct lines.  The west section, from La Motte-Picquet to Grenelle à Porte d'Auteuil was initially a part of line 8. 

Line 8 was the last line created by the agreement of 30 March 1898, and consists of a route between Opéra and Porte d'Auteuil via Grenelle.  In March 1910, the line was branched off and opened with line 7, and a branch leaving the station of Grenelle to the port of Sèvres (today Balard) was added to the route.  The trains alternately traveled along the two branches.

Work on the line began in April 1908 with an underwater construction site in the Seine between the stations of Concorde and Invalides on one end and another construction site at Pont Mirabeau on the other. The first site was completed in January 1911, after being delayed during the 1910 Great Flood of Paris. 

The tunnel under the Seine is made up of five box beams, between 35 and 44 meters long, pre-assembled on the quai de Javel (now the quai André-Citroën).  This tunnel was dug using the method of wooden planks on top of a foundation made of chalk and shale. It contains a lining of iron positioned under a brick roof.  The construction of the tunnel on the rive droite was more delicate because of its less solid alluvium, thus three additional beams were required which were assembled at Mirabeau.  The presence of a railroad line running from Invalides to Versailles (line C of the RER) made work particularly difficult, and a final beam was buried under the tunnel.  Work began in August 1907 but was not finished until 1913, also delayed by the 1910 Great Flood of Paris.

The section between Invalides and Javel did not present any particular difficulties and was completed in 1910.  The Grenelle station is constructed according to a double-station configuration, which allows for the simultaneous departure of trains towards Auteuil and the planned branch towards the porte of Sèvres on its own level, as well as the arrival of both trains in the opposite direction in a central platform on another level. 

While work at pont Mirabeau was ongoing, the line was opened to the public on 13 July 1913 between the stations Beaugrenelle and Opéra and was extended on 30 September 1913 to Porte d'Auteuil. In 1914, line 8 contained fifteen stations between Porte d'Auteuil and Opéra.

The birth of line 10
The principle of a circular line, conceived at the start of the 1900s, led to the creation of a line called Ceinture intérieure des Invalids aux Invalides (inner belt from Invalides to Invalides).  This 11.7 kilometer section was realized in 1907 under the name of line 10.

On the rive droite, the line had to borrow the platforms of line 8, and as such a set of complex connections were created under the esplanade of Invalides with the creation of a large loop.  However, in October 1912, the principle of an interior belt was abandoned and line 10 was left to connect Invalides to Bastille via the rive gauche.

Work on the section between Invalides and Croix-Rouge began in 1913 and ended on 18 March 1920.  However the prospect of low revenues that would certainly result from such a small section serving only neighborhoods of little activity caused the Compagnie du chemin de fer métropolitain de Paris (CMP) to delay the construction and postpone the opening and what would surely be a resulting deficit as far back as possible.  Finally, after being required by the city to do so, the company opened the line for use on 30 December 1923. The new line 10 consisted of six stations, each of which with a vaulted ceiling.  The line borrowed the rue de Four, the rue de Sèvres, and the boulevard des Invalides with a very pronounced bend at the station of Duroc. 

The line quickly became a financial disaster for the CMP, with an average of at most 1,000 passengers per day and per station.  The terminus of Croix-Rouge received only four hundred daily passengers, and the station Varenne, the least frequented station of the entire métro network, saw only three hundred passengers per day.  As a result, only ten trains of six cars serviced the line, two motor cars serving as first class cars, which saw so little traffic that they were replaced with simple motors equipped only with two conductor cars.

A wave of expansions in the east

Expansion work on the line followed in 1923 between Croix-Rouge and Odéon, creating a section 900 meters long connecting two additional stations.  This tiny expansion nevertheless brought an increase of traffic due to its connection with line 4.  It began servicing Mabillon on 10 March 1925 and Odéon on 14 February 1926.

The city of Paris decided in 1925 to connect three lines to line 10.  To this end, many possibilities were examined.  It was first envisioned to extend the line to Bastille via place Jussieu, to complement the creation of a circular line.  However the abandonment of the creation of a circular line made this expansion of little use and would require an underwater section very close to one already planned for line 7 toward pont de Sully.  Eventually, the city chose to limit the line to Jussieu on the rive gauche to create a connection with line 7.

Because of the difficulties the construction of an underwater section would present, and the time it would require, it was planned in 1927 to link to line 10 an expansion of line 7 between Jussieu and Porte de Choisy that was already underway.  With this in mind, it was decided to create a connection with two platforms between the stations Maubert of line 10 and Place Monge of the future line 7 such that line 10 borrowed this section of line 7 while the underwater tunnel that connected the northern and southern sections of the line was constructed.

The tunnel between Saint-Michel boulevard and Porte de Choisy was delivered by the city to CMP in November 1929.  In less than three months, the platform was completed, the lighting installed, and access made possible.  Line 10 arrived at Place d'Italie on 15 February 1930 and at Porte de Choisy on 7 March of the same year, borrowing the platforms of the future line 7.  Before its renovation, the line serviced nineteen stations.

The route of this new section runs parallel to those of above-ground transportation that were especially crowded.  As a result, line 10 saw a rapid increase in use, however its route to the rive gauche did not respond well to the needs of passengers and therefore many used line 10 as a way to make connections to other lines, particularly line 5 at Place d'Italie and line 12 at Sèvres-Babylone to continue on to destinations on the rive droite.  The western section Sèvres-Invalides remained sparsely traveled.

Modification of lines during the 1930s

At the same time that the underwater crossing of line 7 was completed, line 10's tunnel from Maubert to Jussieu was also completed.  The route crossed intersection in the direction of Monge by a flying junction.  On 21 April 1931, the underwater tunnel of line 7 was completed up to the station of Jussieu. The completion of this station necessitated a considerable amount of work with regards to its location under the Halle-aux-Vins, upon which the Faculté des sciences de Jussieu is located.  Here, the tracks are supported by concrete on both sides, and those of lines 7 and 10 lie side by side. 

On 21 April 1931, renovation of lines 7 and 10 began.  Line 7 was extended from Sully-Morland on the rive droite to Porte d'Ivry, and the trains of line 10 ceased use of the middle section of line 7 and instead began the use of the new tracks up to Jussieu.  At the same time, the station Cardinal Lemoine was opened.  Traffic on line 10 diminished significantly but also became more evenly distributed across its sections.

The line saw its largest renovation on its western section in 1937 and impacted several lines. At the time, the route of line 10 did not respond to the needs of a large number of passengers, however the development of a section between La Motte-Picquet and Balard had already been agreed upon, so the creation of line 14, Porte de Vanves – Bienvenüe (today a part of line 13), stayed in the plans.  These considerations led the Conseil municipal de Paris (Municipal Council of Paris) to decide to have multiple extensions added and to effect a partial restructuring of the lines.

Line 8 was given a new terminus at Balard and the old section of line 8 between La Motte-Picquet and Porte d'Auteuil was incorporated into line 10.  Meanwhile, the section of Line 10 between Duroc and Invalides was transferred to line 14.

Work began at the end of 1934.  A new section was constructed linking the station La Motte-Picquet in the west to Duroc in the east with a new intermediate station, Ségur.  The reconfiguration of the three lines' routes was planned so to minimize interruption while construction took place.  The lines were shut down during a single night, between 26 and 27 July 1937.  During this night, teams removed the rails on line 10 on the bend by Duroc, while at the same time others modified the rails by La Motte-Picquet.  Still other teams changed the advisory signs of all involved stations, as well as the line maps in the stations and on the trains.  On the morning of 27 July, line 10 was cut in two: from Jussieu to Duroc on one part, and from La Motte-Picquet to Porte d'Auteuil on the other.  On 29 July, service began from Porte d'Auteuil to Jussieu.

Line 10 steadily began to mold to its present configuration from then on.  One objective stood to link Porte d'Auteuil to Gare d'Austerlitz so to have a more coherent east–west route.  The extension from Jussieu to Gare d'Austerlitz is 1,027 metres long.  Construction began in 1934, however it ran into a number of difficulties resulting from its proximity to the Seine and the railroad tracks of Austerlitz-Gare d'Orsay under which a part of a tunnel had to be used.  Construction of the infrastructure was completed on 14 September 1938, and the extension was opened to the public on 12 July 1939.

In September 1939, World War II broke out and the stations of Croix-Rouge and Cluny-La Sorbonne, considered too close to other stations, were closed.  After these closures, the line encompassed 20 stations all together.  On 3 June 1940, the bombing of Citroën factories damaged the tunnel of line 10 between Chardon-Lagache and Mirabeau.  As a result, service was restricted to the section of Gare d'Austerlitz-Beaugrenelle, which became Charles-Michels.  Three days later, a ferry on its own tracks was put into service running between Beaugrenelle and Porte d'Auteuil.  Normal service was reestablished on 8 June.

Westward expansion

There was a period of forty years between expansion projects.  Finally, in 1977 a new expansion project began with the objective of improving the service to the borough of Boulogne-Billancourt.  Although the borough was served in the south already by line 9, this expansion was justified as the suburban community was the most populated of the Île-de-France apart from Paris and the region is relatively important. 

The expansion work, with consisted of 2.3 kilometers of track and two new stations, began in February 1977 and took place mostly in open air.  The two stations contain central platforms due to the narrowness of the rail network, spanning only twelve meters.  This constraint required a specific type of construction so to assure the structural stability of the adjacent buildings with respect to the settling of the earth.  The stable layer of chalk under the ground allowed for vaulted support structures.  Excavation began with a concrete-filled trench, and the tunnel containing both rails was connected at the buckle of Auteuil by two tunnels each with their own track.  For the first time on the Parisian network, the terminus did not contain a post-arrival turnaround due to the lack of space, so the maneuver took place before the station.  The opening of this section, which is entirely underground, took place in two phases: the first expansion to Boulogne-Jean Jaurès was inaugurated on 3 October 1980, and the second section to Boulogne-Pont de Saint-Cloud was opened on 2 October 1981.  Boulougne at first was serviced by only every other train, with the second train returning eastward via the loop at Auteuil.  After 6:40 pm, all trains serviced the entire line.,

Following the opening of the train station Saint-Michel - Notre-Dame on line B of the RER in February 1988, the station Cluny-La Sorbonne, closed in 1939, was reopened after 50 years of being closed to assure a connection with lines B and C of the RER.

The line was modernized in 1974 with the establishment of the PCC.  In 1975, the Sprague-Thomas train model was replaced by the MA 51 model already found on line 13, with those trains eventually being replaced by the MF 67 model on 15 June 1994. Line 10 is the only line, with the exception of the short 3bis and 7bis lines, that is not equipped with auto-pilot as the trains circulating at that time were not compatible with the technology.  When the trains are eventually replaced with a compatible model, it is believed that the relatively low traffic of the line will not justify the investment in the installation of such a system.

Expansion projects
No expansion project has been officially scheduled for line 10 through the year 2030 in the schéma directeur de la région île-de-France (SDRIF).  Nevertheless, many projects have been proposed over the years.

Westward
One proposal consists of expanding line 10 from Boulogne – Pont de Saint-Cloud to the train station gare de Saint-Cloud, via an intermediate station at Parc de Saint-Cloud. Line 10 would then have a connection with the tramway T2 at Parc de Saint-Cloud and with the Transilien network of Paris-St-Lazare at the train station gare de Saint-Cloud.

This westward expansion was not included in the SDRIF that was adopted in 2008, possibly due to the plan to create a southwestern branch of the Arc Express.

Eastward
A recurring request of passengers has been to extend line 10 eastward, traversing the Seine between gare d'Austerlitz and gare de Lyon to provide service to the latter as these two neighboring train stations are not linked to each other by any métro or RER line. The current configuration of the line and the substrate in the area of the proposed line would make such an extension difficult and therefore improbable.

The extension most likely to be realized is along the RER C route (most likely under the rue du Chevaleret towards the 13th arrondissement, a neighborhood still poorly serviced despite the opening of line 14 to the station Olympiades and in consideration of the construction of a university in the Paris Rive Gauche neighborhood). In 2007, the Conseil de Paris deliberated on the importance of expanding line 10 to Ivry-sur-Seine. The SDRIF adopted in 2008 does not include this proposal, however it does state that optimization studies of service to Seine-Amont suggest that changes and/or expansions to lines 7, 10, and 14 may be necessary."

In October 2008, one of the sociétés d'économie mixte de Paris (SEMAPA) requested a feasibility study to be conducted on an expansion from place Gambetta to Ivry-sur-Seine. An independent study was done by the syndicat des transports d'île-de-France (STIF), in which the stations Chevaleret, Bibliothèque François Mitterrand, Bruneseau, Ivry – Nelson-Mandela, and Ivry-Place Gambetta were included.

See also

Notes

References

 Robert, Jean (1983). Notre Métro (in French). Paris: Jean Robert.
 Tricoire, Jean (1999a). Le métro de Paris – 1899 – 1911 : images de la construction (in French). Paris: Paris Musées. .
 Tricoire, Jean (1999b). Un siècle de métro en 14 lignes.  De Bienvenüe à Météor'' (in French). La Vie du Rail. .

External links

  RATP official website
  RATP English-language website
  Interactive Map of the Paris métro (from RATP's website)

 
Railway lines opened in 1923
1923 establishments in France
Articles containing video clips